The Max Frisch Prize of the City of Zürich, created in 1996, is usually awarded every four years to writers in German-speaking countries. The prize is named after the Swiss writer Max Frisch (1911–1991). The literary award is endowed with a prize sum of 50,000 Swiss francs. In 2018, an additional sponsorship award endowed with 10,000 Swiss francs was introduced in order to be able to support writers of the younger generation as well. The award honors authors whose work addresses fundamental issues of democratic society in an artistically uncompromising manner. The Max Frisch Foundation at ETH Zürich is responsible for judging and determining the winners. The City of Zürich is financing the award and its hosting.

Recipients 
1998: Tankred Dorst
2002:  
2006: Ralf Rothmann
2011: Barbara Honigmann on 100th birthday of Max Frisch
2014: Robert Menasse
2018: Maja Haderlap; sponsorship award: Dorothee Elmiger
2022: Jonas Lüscher; sponsorship award:

References

External links
 

Swiss literary awards
Awards established in 1996
1996 establishments in Switzerland
Max Frisch